Dactylotula is a genus of moths in the family Gelechiidae.

Species
Dactylotula altithermella (Walsingham, 1903)
Dactylotula kinkerella (Snellen, 1876)

References

Apatetrini